The 2014–15 English Hockey League season took place from September 2014 until April 2015. The regular season consisted of two periods September until December and then February until March. The end of season playoffs were held on the 18 & 19 of April. The Men's Championship was won by Wimbledon and the Women's Championship was won by Surbiton.

The Men's Cup was won by Reading and the Women's Cup was won by Surbiton.

Men's Premier Division League Standings

Results

Women's Investec Premier Division League Standings

Play Offs

Men's Premier

Semi-finals

Third and fourth place

Final

Women's Premier

Semi-finals

Third and fourth place

Final

Men's Cup

Quarter-finals

Semi-finals

Final
(Held at the Lee Valley Hockey & Tennis Centre on 2 May)

Women's Cup

Final

References

England Hockey League seasons
field hockey
field hockey
England